Salvador Zerboni (born May 3, 1979, in Mexico City) is a Mexican actor of Italian descent.

Career 
Salvador Zerboni is famous for his role in film and television productions. He began his career in 2003 in a Chilean production, in the telenovela called Machos. Zerboni appeared in the television series RBD: La Familia in 2007 and in El Pantera in 2009. Salvador Zerboni took part in La Reina del Sur (telenovela) and [[Persons Unknown (TV 
series)|Persons Unknown]]. He also appeared in Rudo y Cursi in 2008.  In 2010 he contributed to the series Soy tu fan. The same year he participated in the series [[La 
Mariposa]].

As of 2012 he made his Televisa debut. He played the antagonist character Gabino Mendoza in the remake of 1996's series Cañaveral de pasiones in  Abismo de pasión. In 
2013 he took part in Libre para amarte with Gloria Trevi. He was also one of the main antagonists in the TV series when playing "Horacio Espinoza" in Quiero Amarte sharing 
credits with Karyme Lozano and Cristian de la Fuente. He was also one of three main antagonists in the TV series when he played "Leonel Madrigal" in A que no me dejas sharing 
credits with Camila Sodi and Osvaldo Benavides.

More recently, he has participated in a TV competition called Reto 4 Elementos, which consists of physical, mental and emotional challenges. He was booted off after an initial loss but returned and is currently participating on the team known as Vengadores.

Filmography

Telenovelas
La Reina del Sur (2011) - Ramiro Vargas "El Ratas" (Antagonist)
Abismo de pasión (2012) - Gabino Mendoza (Main antagonist)
Libre para amarte (2013) - Norberto (Special appearance)
Quiero amarte (2013–14) - Horacio Espinoza - (Antagonist)
A que no me dejas (2015–16) - Leonel Madrigal - (Antagonist)
El bienamado (2017) - Jairo Portela - (Antagonist)
Parientes a la fuerza (2021–22) - Juan "Juancho" Hernández (Main role)

Series
Rebelde (2006) - Mateo
RBD: La Familia  (2007) - Daniel
El Pantera (2009) - Gabriel
Soy tu fan - 2010
La Mariposa (2012) - Bill Smith

Films
Rudo y Cursi (2008) - Jorge W
Melted Hearts (2009) - Brian Lauper

References

External links 
 

1979 births
Living people
Male actors from Mexico City
Mexican male telenovela actors
Mexican people of Italian descent
21st-century Mexican male actors